Annette Thommessen (20 May 1932 – 6 December 1994) was a French-born organizational leader who settled in Norway.

She was born in Paris to Maurice Arosa Roosevelt and Raymonde Schaeffer, and married Henrik Peter Thommessen in 1953. She moved to Norway in 1954, and was the mother of politician Olaf Thommessen. From 1978 onwards she was engaged in the treatment of the Vietnamese boat people, refugees from Vietnam after the Vietnam War. She initiated the establishment of the Norwegian Organization for Asylum Seekers, which she chaired from 1984 to 1994. She received the Fritt Ord Award in 1992, and the Humanist Award in 1993.

References

1932 births
1994 deaths
People from Paris
French emigrants to Norway
Norwegian human rights activists